Baie Verte ("Green Bay" in French) may refer to:

 Baie Verte, New Brunswick, a community
 Baie Verte, Newfoundland and Labrador, a town
 Baie Verte (electoral district), a provincial electoral district in Newfoundland and Labrador
 Baie Verte (Northumberland Strait), a bay in New Brunswick
 Baie Verte Academy, in the Nova Central School District 
 Baie Verte Peninsula, Newfoundland

See also
 Green Bay (disambiguation)